The Eastern Zone was one of the three regional zones of the 1973 Davis Cup.

10 teams entered the Eastern Zone, with 8 teams competing in the preliminary round to join the previous year's finalists Australia and India in the main draw. The winner of the main draw went on to compete in the Inter-Zonal Zone against the winners of the Americas Zone and Europe Zone.

Australia defeated India in the final and progressed to the Inter-Zonal Zone.

Preliminary round

Draw

Results
South Korea vs. Japan

Indonesia vs. Hong Kong

Malaysia vs. Pakistan

South Vietnam vs. Sri Lanka

Main Draw

Draw

Quarterfinals
Japan vs. Indonesia

Pakistan vs. South Vietnam

Semifinals
Japan vs. Australia

India vs. Pakistan

Final
India vs. Australia

References

External links
Davis Cup official website

Davis Cup Asia/Oceania Zone
Eastern Zone
Davis Cup
Davis Cup
Davis Cup
Davis Cup